Uroš Tripković (born September 11, 1986) is a Serbian former professional basketball player. He represented the Serbian national basketball team internationally.

Player profile
Tripković was a skilled guard and a prolific 3-point shooter. He was considered by many to be one of the best young guards in Europe. He was a natural scorer with a great release on his jump shots and very good shooting mechanics. He was also an excellent free throw shooter. He played the point guard position when he was younger, but later shooting guard was his main position.

Professional career
Tripković grew up with the Borac Čačak youth system. He started his professional career in 2002 with KK Partizan. In 2009, he moved to the Liga ACB side DKV Joventut. In August 2010, he moved to Unicaja Málaga. On January 5, 2012, he parted ways with the club and became free agent.

In September 2012, after more than half year of not playing for anyone, Tripković started talks with the Italian club Virtus Bologna, but few days after negotiations have been broken down. Finally, he signed a contract with the Spanish club CB Valladolid. In December 2012, he moved to Turkey and signed a 1.5 year contract with Fenerbahçe Ülker. However he left Fenerbahçe at the end of the season.

On October 30, 2013, he signed a one-year deal with the Italian team Vanoli Cremona. After he suffered a season-ending injury, Cremona decided to part ways with him in January 2014.

On October 8, 2014, Tripković announced his retirement from the professional basketball, due to the injuries he suffered over the previous few seasons.

National team career
Tripković was a member of the senior men's Serbia and Montenegro national basketball team at the 2006 FIBA World Championship. After missing the EuroBasket 2007 due to injuries, he won the silver medal at the EuroBasket 2009 with the Serbian national basketball team. He skipped the 2010 FIBA World Championship, due to a foot injury.

Post-playing career 
Tripković owns and operates blueberry orchards, the first orchard is in Preljina, near his hometown Čačak, and the second-one is near Topola.

EuroLeague career statistics

|-
| style="text-align:left;"| 2002–03
| style="text-align:left;"| Partizan
| 3 || 0 || 1.7 || .000 || .000 || .000 || .3 || .0 || .0 || .0 || .0 || - .7
|-
| style="text-align:left;"| 2003–04
| style="text-align:left;"| Partizan
| 1 || 0 || 2.0 || .000 || .000 || .000 || 2.0 || .0 || .0 || .0 || .0 || .0
|-
| style="text-align:left;"| 2004–05
| style="text-align:left;"| Partizan
| 14 || 7 || 26.2 || .362 || .355 || style="background:#CFECEC;"|.969 || 1.3 || 1.4 || 1.0 || .0 || 10.7 || 4.7
|-
| style="text-align:left;"| 2005–06
| style="text-align:left;"| Partizan
| 12 || 11 || 28.3 || .336 || .286 || .650 || 1.3 || 1.9 || 1.3 || .1 || 10.3 || 3.3
|-
| style="text-align:left;"| 2006–07
| style="text-align:left;"| Partizan
| 19 || 14 || 25.1 || .385 || .347 || .794 || 2.1 || 1.2 || 1.0 || .0 || 10.0 || 4.6
|-
| style="text-align:left;"| 2007–08
| style="text-align:left;"| Partizan
| 23 || 9 || 18.8 || .363 || .314 || .783 || 1.8 || 1.0 || .2 || .0 || 7.1 || 1.7
|-
| style="text-align:left;"| 2008–09
| style="text-align:left;"| Partizan
| 19 || 2 || 23.3 || .359 || .387 || .811 || 1.7 || .7 || .4 || .0 || 10.1 || 4.1
|-
| style="text-align:left;"| 2010–11
| style="text-align:left;"| Unicaja
| 15 || 4 || 17.9 || .413 || .397 || .917 || 1.5 || 1.1 || .7 || .0 || 8.1 || 5.4
|-
| style="text-align:left;"| 2012–13
| style="text-align:left;"| Fenerbahçe
| 7 || 1 || 10.8 || .346 || .429 || 1.000 || .7 || .7 || .4 || .0 || 4.3 || 1.3
|- class="sortbottom"
| style="text-align:left;"| Career
| style="text-align:left;"|
| 113 || 48 || 21.3 || .367 || .349 || .829 || 1.6 || 1.1 || .7 || .0 || 8.6 || 3.5

See also 
 List of Serbia men's national basketball team players
 List of youngest EuroLeague players

References

External links

 Euroleague.net profile
 Draftexpress.com profile
 NBA.com Draft profile
 FIBA game-center profile
 FIBA archive profile
 TBLStat.net profile

1986 births
Living people
ABA League players
Basketball League of Serbia players
Basketball players from Čačak
Baloncesto Málaga players
CB Valladolid players
Fenerbahçe men's basketball players
Joventut Badalona players
KK Partizan players
Vanoli Cremona players
Liga ACB players
Serbia men's national basketball team players
Serbian men's basketball players
Serbian expatriate basketball people in Italy
Serbian expatriate basketball people in Spain
Serbian expatriate basketball people in Turkey
Shooting guards
2006 FIBA World Championship players